The 1918–19 Toronto Arenas season was the second season of the Toronto franchise of the National Hockey League. After being operated on a temporary basis in the previous year, the team became a formal entity, known as the 'Toronto Arena Hockey Club.' The club played 18 games and suspended operations.

Regular season

The NHL had been formed mainly because the other four clubs in the National Hockey Association were unable to expel Toronto Blueshirts owner Eddie Livingstone, even though they had long since lost patience with him. To get around this, they suspended the NHA's operations and created the NHL, but didn't invite Livingstone to join them. Motivated by a desire to have a team in Toronto, as well as balance the schedule with the Quebec Bulldogs sitting out the season, the NHL granted a temporary franchise to the Toronto Arena Company, who then leased most of Livingstone's players pending resolution of the dispute.

However, the "Torontos" won the Stanley Cup, throwing a monkey wrench into the other owners' plans to get rid of Livingstone. Estimating that his team was worth $20,000, Livingstone was unwilling to accept the Arena Company's offer of $7,000. When the Arena Company refused to bend, Livingstone sued the Arena Company and Charlie Querrie for the $20,000. A league meeting of the old NHA proved futile as heated arguments broke out between Livingstone and the other owners. The old NHA was extinguished. However, Montreal Canadiens owner George Kennedy gave some ground, saying that if Livingstone dropped his lawsuits, he might be allowed in the league. 

In the meantime, the Arena Company returned its temporary franchise to the NHL. It then formed a separate club, the Toronto Arena Hockey Club, nominally owned by Arena Company treasurer Hubert Vearncombe. The new club applied for full membership in the NHL, which was duly granted. This separated the hockey club from the Livingstone lawsuits, though the franchise still used Livingstone's players without permission.

It was announced on February 18, that Ken Randall and Harry Meeking had signed with Glace Bay of the Maritime League with the Arenas' permission. The game that night was attended by only 1,000 fans watching a 4–3 overtime loss to Ottawa. After a follow-up game in Ottawa on February 20, lost 9–3, manager Querrie announced that the club sought to withdraw from the NHL season and this was agreed to by Ottawa and Montreal. The NHL season ended at 18 games, with Montreal and Ottawa to play off for the championship.

Final standings

Record vs. opponents

Schedule and results

First half

Second half

Playoffs
The Arenas did not qualify for the playoffs.

Player statistics

Scorers

Transactions

 December 14, 1918: Acquired Rusty Crawford from the Ottawa Senators for future considerations
 December 15, 1918: Signed Free Agent Paul Jacobs
 December 28, 1918: Signed Free Agent Bert Lindsay
 January 19, 1919: Loaned Harry Cameron to Ottawa Senators to complete December 14 trade

See also
List of pre-NHL seasons
1918 in sports
1919 in sports

References

External links
NHL Official Website
Hockeydb entry for Arenas 1918–19 season

Toronto Arenas season, 1918-19
Toronto
Toronto
Toronto Maple Leafs seasons